Taxonomy mnemonics are used to memorize the scientific classification applied in taxonomy. They are usually constructed with a series of words that begin with the letters KPCOFGS, corresponding to the initials of the primary taxonomic ranks. Words beginning with D (corresponding to domain) are sometimes added to the beginning of the sequence, and words beginning with S (corresponding to subspecies) are sometimes added at the end of the sequence.

For example:

King Phillip came over for good spaghetti has the first letter of each word corresponding in order to the first letter of the descending order of scientific classification.

Zoology mnemonics 
Zoology mnemonics, which are used to memorize the scientific taxonomic classification system, include:
 "Do kindly place candy out for good students"
 "Keep pond clean or fish get sick"
 "Kings play chess on fancy glass stools"
 "King prawns curl over fresh green salad"

Botany mnemonics 
Botanical taxonomy uses the rank of division in place of phylum. Some botany mnemonics follow one of the "King Phillip" variants, with David in place of Phillip.

See also 
 Biological classification

References 

Science mnemonics